The Tom's Mill Fire was a wildfire that burned in the Ozark–St. Francis National Forest, 3.5 miles north of Lees Chapel, Arkansas in the United States. The cause of the fire remains unknown.

Events
The Tom's Mill Fire was reported on November 25, 2017, at 2:45 PM in the Ozark–St. Francis National Forest, approximately 3.5 miles north of Lees Chapel. The cause of the fire is unknown. It was fueled by hardwood litter and timber. The United States Forest Service stopped reporting on the fire on November 29, 2017, at 90 percent containment.

References

External links
 

2017 wildfires in the United States
November 2017 events in the United States
Ozark–St. Francis National Forest
Wildfires in Arkansas
2017 in Arkansas